Henry S. Thompson (born 1824 or 1825) was an American songwriter of the mid-nineteenth century.

Little is known of Thompson other than his works, mainly ballads used in blackface minstrel shows; 48 works were published under the name H. S. Thompson between 1849 and 1885.

Birth and Family
Based on U.S. Census, musicologist Ralph Richey estimated that Thompson was born in 1824 or 1825 in northern Essex County, Massachusetts, but the Massachusetts Birth Records listing the birth of his daughter, Sarah Oliver Thompson in 1848 in Ipswich, Massachusetts indicate that his own place of birth was Manchester, New Hampshire, as do the birth records for his son, Frank Waldo Thompson in 1851, and daughter Ida May Thompson in 1853. In 1845, he had married Sarah E. Oliver in Boston.

Career
The 1850 census records him in Georgetown, Massachusetts, but by 1851 he had moved to Newburyport where he was a teacher, performer, and impresario, first advertising his Singing School in January of 1851. By April of that year, he was offering a "Musical Entertainment," including a quartet singing his own composition, "Willie's on the dark blue sea." Later he was connected with several minstrel companies, including Morris Brothers, Pell, Huntley's, and Morris Bros., Pell & Trowbridge's Minstrels in Boston and Morris and Wilson's Opera Troupe in St. Louis (1865–66).

Works
 "Effie the maid of the Mill," E. H. Wade, 1855, Boston.
 "Mother's dead and gone, or, The Dismal Glen," G. P. Reed, 1850, Boston.
 "Willie's on the dark blue sea," published by Oliver Ditso, 1853, Boston.
 "Ida May," published by Oliver Ditson in 1853, Boston.
 "I'm lonely since my mother died," published by Oliver Ditson, 1863, Boston.
 "Cousin Jedediah," published by Oliver Ditson, 1863, Boston.

Thompson's "Down by the River Liv'd a Maiden," published in 1863, is generally believed to be the basis for Percy Montrose's 1884 "Oh My Darling, Clementine."

Thompson's most famous work, "Annie Lisle," is remembered as the melody for the Cornell University alma mater "Far Above Cayuga's Waters" and other school anthems.

A slightly altered version of the lyrics of "Lilly Dale," an 1852 song similarly about a young maiden felled by disease, appear in the 1916 novel A Portrait of the Artist as a Young Man by James Joyce. Country musician Bob Wills recorded an arrangement as "Lily Dale," which itself was covered by Dolly Parton as "Billy Dale."

The tune of "Lily Dale" was paired with lyrics for "O Ye Mountains High" by Charles W. Penrose in hymnbooks of the Church of Jesus Christ of Latter-day Saints as early as 1880. It is number 34 in their current hymnbook.

References

External links

1824 births
Year of death unknown
Songwriters from Massachusetts
Blackface minstrel songwriters
People from Topsfield, Massachusetts 
People from Newburyport, Massachusetts